Peter Spier (June 6, 1927 – April 27, 2017) was a Dutch-American illustrator and writer who created more than thirty children's books.

Biographical information

Spier was born in Amsterdam, North Holland, and grew up in Broek in Waterland, the son of Jo Spier, a popular artist and illustrator, and Tineke van Raalte. Jo Spier was Jewish, and, during the Second World War, Peter and his father were two of nine prisoners of Villa Bouchina and were later imprisoned in Theresienstadt. After the war he studied at the Rijksakademie in Amsterdam and joined the Royal Netherlands Navy for four years. The entire Spier family emigrated to the United States in 1950. Spier started his career as a commercial artist for advertising agencies and only later focused  on writing and illustrating children's books. He died on April 27, 2017 in Port Jefferson, New York.

Medium and artistic style

Like other children's illustrators such as Beatrix Potter or Christopher Wormell, Peter Spier demonstrates his talent and skills as an artist/illustrator using pen, ink and watercolour on paper. Many of Spier's illustrations are extremely detailed and historically accurate. Close examination will often yield a humorous scene not readily apparent at first glance the finding of which often delights readers of all ages.

Copyrights

Spier reserved all rights and retained the copyrights to his works. In correspondence he noted that many of the original publishing plates used to reproduce his work were not available though the original works were thought to survive.

Publishers

The Doubleday & Company, Inc., of Garden City, New York originally published many of Spier's works including The Mother Goose Library Series: "London Bridge Is Falling Down!". More recent publications can be found under the labels Doubleday Books For Young Readers, Dragonfly Books and Random House.

Awards

Noah's Ark (1977) won the annual Caldecott Medal from the American Library Association, recognizing the illustrator of the year's "most distinguished American picture book for children". In its first paperback edition, it won a 1982 National Book Award in category Picture Books.
The book was named to the Lewis Carroll Shelf Award list in 1978.
 
People (1980) won a Christopher Award and was one of five finalists for the 1981 National Book Award in category Children's Nonfiction. It was also adapted into a 1995 animated television special that soon aired on Disney Channel.

The Fox Went Out on a Chilly Night (1961) was named a Caldecott Honor Book by the American Library Association in 1962.

Works

 Island City: Adventures In Old New York (1961)
 The Fox Went out on a Chilly Night: An Old Song (1961)
 London Bridge Is Falling Down! (1967), in the Mother Goose Library Series
 To Market! To Market! (1967)
 Hurrah, We're Outward Bound! (1968)
 And So My Garden Grows (1969)
 Of Dikes and Windmills (1969)
 The Erie Canal (1970)
 Gobble, Growl, Grunt (1971)
 Fast-Slow High-Low (1972)
 Crash! Bang! Boom! (1972)
 Tin Lizzie (1975)
 Noah's Ark (1977)
 Bored—nothing to do! (1978)
 Oh, Were They Ever Happy! (1978)
 The Legend of New Amsterdam (1979)
 Nothing Like a Fresh Coat of Paint (1980)
 People (1980)
 Peter Spier's Village Board Books (1981)
 Bill's Service Station
 Firehouse
 The Toy Shop
 My School
 Pet Store
 Food Market
 Peter Spier's Christmas
 Peter Spier's Little Bible Storybooks
 Genesis creation narrative|The Creation
 Noah
 Jonah
 Peter Spier's Little Animal Books
 Little Cats
 Little Dogs
 Little Ducks
 Little Rabbits
 Dreams
 We the People: The Constitution of the United States (1987)
 Peter Spier's Advent Calendar: Little Town of Bethlehem
 Peter Spier's Advent Calendar: Silent Night, Holy Night
 Rain (1982)
 No Such Things (1983)
 Christmas! (1983)
 The Book Of Jonah (1985)
 Big Trucks, Little Trucks (1988)
 Fast Cars, Slow Cars (1988)
 Here Come The Fire Trucks (1988)
 Trucks That Dig And Dump (1988)
 Circus (1995)

As illustrator 

 The Cow Who Fell in the Canal (1957), by Phyllis Krasilovsky
 Hans Brinker, or The Silver Skates (1958), by Mary Mapes Dodge (1865, revised 1876) 
 Betty Crocker's Guide to Easy Entertaining (1959)
 The Sailing Ship (1964), by Jan de Hartog 
 History of the Theater (1964), by Hannelore Marek 
 Great Furniture Styles, 1660–1830 (1965), by Donald D. MacMillan 
 Elizabethan England (1965), by Anthony West
 Here and There: 100 poems about places (1967), compiled by Elinor Parker 
 The Erie Canal (1970), an edition of "Low Bridge" by Thomas S. Allen (1905), "includes musical notation" 
 The Star-Spangled Banner (1973), an edition of "The Star-Spangled Banner" by Francis Scott Key (1814) —"includes music, background history, and pictures of flags" 
 "A Traveler’s Tale of Ancient Tikal," National Geographic (December 1975), pp. 799-811.
 We The People: The Constitution Of The United States Of America (1987) —"includes the text of the Constitution of the United States", a bicentennial edition of the US Constitution 
 The Last Hurdle (1988), by F. K. Brown (1953) 
 The Little Riders (1988), by Margaretha Shemin  —later adapted as a Disney film

Notes

References

External links

 Peter Spier Papers in the de Grummond Children's Literature Collection — with biographical sketch
 Review of "The Fox Went Out on a Chilly Night", a 1961 Caldecott Honor Book by Spier
 Lambiek Comiclopedia page.

1927 births
2017 deaths
American children's writers
American people of Dutch-Jewish descent
Artists from Amsterdam
Caldecott Medal winners
American children's book illustrators
Dutch emigrants to the United States
Dutch illustrators
Dutch Jews
Jewish American artists
Jewish American writers
National Book Award for Young People's Literature winners
Royal Netherlands Navy personnel
Theresienstadt Ghetto survivors
People from Waterland
21st-century American Jews